Hongchunping Temple is a Buddhist temple located on Mount Emei, in Emeishan City, Sichuan, China.

Name
The name of Hongchunping is derived from three 1,200-years-old Ailanthus altissima trees.

History

The temple was first built by master Chushan Xingyi in the early Ming dynasty (1368–1644) with the name of "Thousand Buddha Chan Temple", commonly known as "Thousand Buddha Temple". It was largely extended in 1631, in the reign of Chongzhen Emperor (1628–1644) of the late Ming dynasty.

In 1778, in the 43rd year of Qianlong period (1736–1795) in the Qing dynasty (1644–1911), a catastrophic fire demolished most of its buildings. Twelve years later, the temple was restored and redecorated by master Eyun. The name was changed into "Hongchunping Temple" (Hongchun means Ailanthus altissima) because it had three 1,200-years-old Ailanthus altissima trees.

In 1936, Chiang Kai-shek visited the temple while he inspected the Officer Training Corps on Mount Emei.

The temple has been designated as a National Key Buddhist Temple in Han Chinese Area by the State Council of China in 1983.

Architecture

Mahavira Hall
The Mahavira Hall enshrining a statue of Samantabhadra. The statues of Eighteen Arhats sitting on the seats before both sides of the gable walls.

References

Buddhist temples in Sichuan
Buildings and structures in Leshan
Tourist attractions in Leshan
1790 establishments in China
18th-century Buddhist temples
Religious buildings and structures completed in 1790